David Harold (born 9 December 1966) is an English former professional snooker player from Stoke-on-Trent. He was known by the nicknames of "the Hard Man" and "the Stoke Potter" (conflating his home city's pottery industry and his profession of potting snooker balls). He was also the first player on the television circuit to sport a plaster on his chin as a guide for his cue, which is a practice now adopted by Graeme Dott. As an amateur he played as David Harold, but after turning professional in 1991 he was registered as Dave Harold.
 
He won one ranking title, reached two further finals and several semi-finals, and spent four seasons ranked among the top 16. Harold was renowned for both his very strong defensive play and his unusual cue-action, with which he is able to unleash a great deal of power on a shot without using backswing on the cue. Despite safety play ultimately being considered his strong point, he compiled 143 century breaks. Steve Davis has commented that he is not the most naturally gifted player, but makes up for this with strong tactical play. For his technique and grinding play he has been compared to Cliff Thorburn.

Career

Early career

Soon after turning professional, Harold won the 1993 Asian Open, beating Darren Morgan 9–3 in the final. Ranked 93rd in the world at the time, he became the lowest-ranked player ever to win a ranking tournament. He never repeated this achievement, although he reached his second ranking final in the 1994 Grand Prix, losing 6–9 to John Higgins.

Top 16 (1996–2002)

After 1994, Harold did not reach a third ranking final until 2008, although he reached a total of ten semi-finals in ranking tournaments, and was a Top-16 player for four seasons between 1995/1996 and 2001/2002, reaching a career-best position of No. 11 in the world rankings in the 1996/97 season. In the 1996 Welsh Open, he lost in the semi-finals, 1–6, to eventual winner Mark Williams.

He competed in his first and only World Championship quarter-final in the 1996 event, where he lost 7–13 to Nigel Bond. He also lost 5–6 to Bond in his 1996 British Open semi-final less than two weeks earlier.

In the 1998 Grand Prix, he knocked out Stephen Hendry and John Higgins en route to the semi-finals, but lost narrowly to eventual champion Stephen Lee. 1998 also saw him reach his first semi-final in the UK Championship, where he was defeated 9–7 by Matthew Stevens.

In the 1999 Grand Prix Harold led Mark Williams 5–3 in the semi-finals but lost 5–6. This was Harold's last ranking semi-final until 2008, although he also reached the semis in the non-ranking 2001 Masters, defeating John Higgins and John Parrott, but losing his semi-final 5–6 to eventual runner-up Fergal O'Brien after having led 5–1.

2003–2015
Following a poor season in 2001–2002, Harold dropped out of the Top 16, down to number 29 in the World Rankings. A broken wrist sustained on New Year's Eve 2003 saw him drop further down the rankings, out of the top 32, although he had a better 2005/2006 season. Another consistent season in 2006/2007 helped Harold back up to No. 30 in the world rankings for 2007/2008.

2007/2008 started with a quarter-final appearance in the Shanghai Masters, losing to eventual winner Dominic Dale. Harold did not get past the round robin phase of the Grand Prix, finishing fifth in his group of six players; but in the 2007 UK Championship, Harold eliminated World Number 2 Graeme Dott 9–7 in the first round to achieve a place in the last 16 of the tournament for the first time since 1999. However, he lost 2–9 in the second round to Mark Selby. He qualified for the final stages of the World Championship with a 10–4 win over Mike Dunn, but lost 10–3 at the Crucible in the first round proper to Shaun Murphy.

During a preliminary round match against local wildcard Jin Long in the 2008 China Open, Harold was locked at 4–4. He took time out before the deciding frame to leave the playing arena and consume a couple of bananas, returning replenished to finish the job with a clearance on the colours. This gave rise to the affectionate nickname "Bananaman" on the Betfair snooker forum, referring to a children's TV character who gained superhuman powers. Harold also put up a battle against Shaun Murphy in the next round, but eventually lost 5–3; the last frame set a record at the time for being the longest ever in snooker history (93 minutes and 12 seconds).

Harold retained his Top 32 ranking, and started the 2008–09 season ranked at #28, his highest ranking since 2003. In the first ranking event of the new season, the 2008 Northern Ireland Trophy, he beat Ricky Walden 5–2, Graeme Dott 5–3, Stephen Lee 5–4 and defending champion Stephen Maguire to reach the semi-finals, his first appearance at that stage of a ranking event for five years. He then moved into a 5–1 lead against John Higgins and won 6–4, to reach his first final since 1994, which he lost 9–3 to Ronnie O'Sullivan. Harold's performance in this tournament moved him up to 14th in the provisional world rankings. Harold remarked after the final that, aside from claiming the World Championship, his one other remaining ambition in the game is to score a victory over O'Sullivan, who he has never beaten in a ranking tournament. The 2008 Northern Ireland Trophy marked his tenth consecutive failure to do so.

Harold subsequently qualified for the 2008 Shanghai Masters and Grand Prix. In the former, he defeated home favourite Ding Junhui in the last 32, before losing 4–5 (from 3–0 and 4–1 up) against Steve Davis; however, in the latter he was eliminated in the first round by Ali Carter. A less successful run of results in the second half of the season saw him fall out of the Top 16 in the provisional rankings, largely due to his failure to qualify for the 2009 World Championship, although he started the 2009/2010 season ranked at No. 19, an improvement of nine places on the previous season.

Harold appeared in the Welsh Open in January 2010 but lost in the first round 5–1 to Stephen Hendry. In September he beat Shaun Murphy 3–0 in the newly formed World Open in Glasgow but subsequently lost in the next round to Jamie Cope 3–2.

The 2012–13 season saw Harold win 2 qualifying matches to reach the main stages of the 2012 Wuxi Classic, however, he lost his wildcard match to Chinese player Rouzi Maimaiti. Harold subsequently failed to qualify for the next four ranking events, losing to players such as Ali Carter, Barry Hawkins, and Cao Yupeng. He did, however, qualify for the German Masters, beating Craig Steadman 5–3 and Ryan Day 5–4 to qualify for the Last 32 of the event, where he lost 3–5 to former world champion Graeme Dott. He only won 1 more match in ranking event qualifiers for the rest of the season, culminating with a 9–10 defeat the Alfie Burden in qualifying for the World Championship. Harold played in many of the Players Tour Championship event throughout the season, his best results being three Last 16 appearances, and a further two Last 32 results, finishing 39th on the Order of Merit, outside of the Top 26 that qualified for the Finals.

Harold started the 2013–14 season ranked 50th in the world rankings. He retired in May 2015 after suffering from eyesight problems.

Personal life

Harold was born in Stoke-on-Trent and still lives there to this day. He is a Stoke City FC fan. He has three children and is separated from his wife.

Performance and rankings timeline

Career finals

Ranking finals: 3 (1 title)

Non-ranking finals: 2 (1 title)

Pro-am finals: 6 (3 titles)

References

External links

Dave Harold at worldsnooker.com

Profile on the Global Snooker

1966 births
Living people
English snooker players
Sportspeople from Stoke-on-Trent